Neoconocephalus is a genus of katydids or bush crickets in the tribe Copiphorini, from the Americas.

Species
Neoconocephalus aduncus Scudder, 1878
Neoconocephalus affinis Beauvois, 1805
Neoconocephalus alienus Walker, 1869
Neoconocephalus americanus Karny, 1907
Neoconocephalus anodon Redtenbacher, 1891
Neoconocephalus argentinus Redtenbacher, 1891
Neoconocephalus aries Scudder, 1878
Neoconocephalus assimilis Karny, 1907
Neoconocephalus bivocatus Walker, Whitesell & Alexander, 1973
Neoconocephalus bolivari Redtenbacher, 1891
Neoconocephalus boraceae Piza, 1952
Neoconocephalus boraceanus Piza, 1983
Neoconocephalus brachypterus Redtenbacher, 1891
Neoconocephalus brevis Redtenbacher, 1891
Neoconocephalus brunneri Redtenbacher, 1891
Neoconocephalus carbonarius Redtenbacher, 1891
Neoconocephalus carinatus Redtenbacher, 1891
Neoconocephalus caudellianus Davis, 1905
Neoconocephalus chapadensis Bruner, 1915
Neoconocephalus colligatus Walker, 1869
Neoconocephalus colorificus Walker, 1869
Neoconocephalus conifrons Redtenbacher, 1891
Neoconocephalus conspersus Redtenbacher, 1891
Neoconocephalus corumbaensis Piza, 1969
Neoconocephalus creusae Piza, 1970
Neoconocephalus curitibensis Piza, 1952
Neoconocephalus cylindricus Karny, 1907
Neoconocephalus dispar Karny, 1907
Neoconocephalus elongatus Redtenbacher, 1891
Neoconocephalus ensifer Bolívar, 1884
Neoconocephalus ensiger Harris, 1841
Neoconocephalus exaltatus Walker, 1869
Neoconocephalus exiliscanorus Davis, 1887
Neoconocephalus ferreirai Piza, 1971
Neoconocephalus finitimus Karny, 1907
Neoconocephalus flavirostris Redtenbacher, 1891
Neoconocephalus fratellus Griffini, 1899
Neoconocephalus fuscinervis Redtenbacher, 1891
Neoconocephalus gaucho Piza, 1969
Neoconocephalus giganticus Bruner, 1915
Neoconocephalus gladiator Redtenbacher, 1891
Neoconocephalus globiceps Karny, 1907
Neoconocephalus globifer Redtenbacher, 1891
Neoconocephalus globifrons Karny, 1907
Neoconocephalus globosus Karny, 1907
Neoconocephalus gracilipes Bolívar, 1884
Neoconocephalus guyvalerioi Piza, 1972
Neoconocephalus harti Karny, 1909
Neoconocephalus ichneumoneus Bolívar, 1884
Neoconocephalus incertus Piza, 1958
Neoconocephalus infuscatus Scudder, 1875
Neoconocephalus irroratus Burmeister, 1838
Neoconocephalus karollenkoi Piza, 1983
Neoconocephalus kraussi Redtenbacher, 1891
Neoconocephalus lancifer Burmeister, 1838
Neoconocephalus lavrensis Piza, 1971
Neoconocephalus longicauda Karny, 1907
Neoconocephalus longifossor Bruner, 1915
Neoconocephalus lyristes Rehn & Hebard, 1905
Neoconocephalus maculosus Redtenbacher, 1891
Neoconocephalus major Karny, 1907
Neoconocephalus matogrossensis Piza, 1983
Neoconocephalus maxillosus Fabricius, 1775
Neoconocephalus maximus Karny, 1907
Neoconocephalus melanorhinus Rehn & Hebard, 1907
Neoconocephalus meridionalis Kirby, 1906
Neoconocephalus mexicanus Saussure, 1859
Neoconocephalus minor Karny, 1907
Neoconocephalus monoceros Stoll, 1813
Neoconocephalus nebrascensis Bruner, 1891
Neoconocephalus necessarius Redtenbacher, 1891
Neoconocephalus nigricans Redtenbacher, 1891
Neoconocephalus nigromaculatus Redtenbacher, 1891
Neoconocephalus nigrosignatus Karny, 1907
Neoconocephalus occidentalis Saussure, 1859
Neoconocephalus pahayokee Walker & Whitesell, 1978
Neoconocephalus palustris Blatchley, 1893
Neoconocephalus paravicinus Piza, 1973
Neoconocephalus parvus Redtenbacher, 1891
Neoconocephalus pichinchae Bolívar, 1881
Neoconocephalus pinicola Walker & Greenfield, 1983
Neoconocephalus pipulus Walker & Greenfield, 1983
Neoconocephalus prasinus Redtenbacher, 1891
Neoconocephalus precarius Piza, 1975
Neoconocephalus procerus Redtenbacher, 1891
Neoconocephalus productus Karny, 1907
Neoconocephalus proximus Redtenbacher, 1891
Neoconocephalus puiggarii Bolívar, 1884
Neoconocephalus pulcher Karny, 1907
Neoconocephalus pullus Karny, 1907
Neoconocephalus punctipes Redtenbacher, 1891
Neoconocephalus purpurascens Walker, 1869
Neoconocephalus redtenbacheri Karny, 1907
Neoconocephalus restrictus Walker, 1869
Neoconocephalus retusiformis Walker & Greenfield, 1983
Neoconocephalus retusus Scudder, 1878
Neoconocephalus rioclarensis Piza, 1975
Neoconocephalus riparius Piza, 1983
Neoconocephalus robustus Scudder, 1862
Neoconocephalus rufescens Redtenbacher, 1891
Neoconocephalus rugosicollis Bolívar, 1881
Neoconocephalus saturatus Griffini, 1899
Neoconocephalus scudderii Bolívar, 1881
Neoconocephalus similis Karny, 1907
Neoconocephalus simulator Walker, 1869
Neoconocephalus spiniger Redtenbacher, 1891
Neoconocephalus spitzi Piza, 1983
Neoconocephalus spiza Walker & Greenfield, 1983
Neoconocephalus stigmaticus Karny, 1907
Neoconocephalus subulatus Bolívar, 1881
Neoconocephalus susurrator Walker & Greenfield, 1983
Neoconocephalus tenuicauda Scudder, 1869
Neoconocephalus testaceus Redtenbacher, 1891
Neoconocephalus triops Linnaeus, 1758
Neoconocephalus trochiceps Karny, 1907
Neoconocephalus truncatirostris Redtenbacher, 1891
Neoconocephalus tuberculatus De Geer, 1773
Neoconocephalus tumidus Karny, 1907
Neoconocephalus velox Rehn & Hebard, 1914
Neoconocephalus vernalis Kirby, 1890
Neoconocephalus vicinus Karny, 1907
Neoconocephalus virescens Karny, 1907
Neoconocephalus viridis Redtenbacher, 1891
Neoconocephalus vittatus Piza, 1973
Neoconocephalus vittifrons Redtenbacher, 1891
Neoconocephalus vittipennis Walker, 1869
Neoconocephalus xiphias Saint-Fargeau & Serville, 1825
Neoconocephalus xiphophorus Piza, 1975''

References

 
Tettigoniidae genera